Pumwani is an estate of Nairobi. In 2005 it had an estimated population of 29,616.

The Pumwani Maternity Hospital is located in Pumwani. It is the largest public maternity hospital in Kenya.

Many Kenyan freedom fighters are known to have lived in Pumwani including the first and the second presidents, Jomo Kenyatta and Daniel Moi. It is also the place where Lord Burden Powell founded the first scouts movement in the interior of Africa.

The St. John's Church is also located in Pumwani. It is the seat of St. John's Archdeaconry of Anglican Church of Kenya.

Pumwani division 

Prior to 2013, Pumwani was also a name of a larger administrative area, Pumwani division. The division was subdivided into five locations: Bahati, Eastleigh North, Eastleigh South, Kamukunji and Pumwani.

Pumwani division had identical borders with Kamukunji Constituency.

Currently, Pumwani represents one of the five electoral wards within Kamukunji Constituency.

References 

Populated places in Kenya
Suburbs of Nairobi
Slums in Kenya